Yuanling County is a county of Hunan Province, China, it is under the administration of Huaihua Prefecturel-level City.

Located in northwest of the province, Yuanling is in the border locations of Huaihua, Xiangxi, Zhangjiajie, Changde and Yiyang five prefecture-level divisions, The Yuan River flows through it southwest to northeast. The county is bordered to the north by Yongding District, to the east by Taoyuan and Anhua Counties, to the south by Xupu and Chenxi Counties, to the west by Luxi, Guzhang and Yongshun Counties. Yuanling County has eight towns and 13 townships under its jurisdiction, the county seat is Yuanling Town.

Ethnic groups

According to the Yuanling County Gazetteer (1993:104), there are 36,715 ethnic Miao and 23,879 ethnic Tujia. There are also 135 ethnic Bai living in the Zhuhong Stream watershed 朱红溪 of Beirong District 北容区, namely the villages of Luoping 落坪, Qijiaxi 七甲溪, Daheping 大合坪.

Climate

References
www.xzqh.org

External links 

 
County-level divisions of Hunan
Huaihua